The 1994 Citizen Cup was a women's tennis tournament played on outdoor clay courts. It was the eighth edition of the Citizen Cup and was a Tier II tournament on the 1994 WTA Tour. The tournament, consisting of a singles and doubles competition, took place from 25 April through 1 May 1994 at the Am Rothenbaum venue in Hamburg, Germany. Second-seeded Arantxa Sánchez Vicario won the singles title and $80,000 first-prize money.

Entrants

Seeds

Champions

Singles

 Arantxa Sánchez Vicario defeated  Steffi Graf 4–6, 7–6(7–3), 7–6(8–6)
 It was Sánchez Vicario's third title of the year, and the 15th of her career.

Doubles

 Jana Novotná /  Arantxa Sánchez Vicario defeated  Eugenia Maniokova /  Leila Meskhi, 6–3, 6–2

References

External links
 International Tennis Federation (ITF) 1994 Citizen Cup tournament details

Tennis tournaments in Germany
Citizen Cup
WTA Hamburg
1994 in German women's sport
1994 in German tennis